Avenal is a suburb of New Zealand's southernmost city, Invercargill. The suburb includes Queens Park and Southland Museum and Art Gallery.

Demographics

Avenal had a population of 1,263 at the 2018 New Zealand census, an increase of 132 people (11.7%) since the 2013 census, and an increase of 105 people (9.1%) since the 2006 census. There were 555 households. There were 615 males and 648 females, giving a sex ratio of 0.95 males per female. The median age was 36.9 years (compared with 37.4 years nationally), with 216 people (17.1%) aged under 15 years, 270 (21.4%) aged 15 to 29, 618 (48.9%) aged 30 to 64, and 159 (12.6%) aged 65 or older.

Ethnicities were 79.8% European/Pākehā, 13.1% Māori, 2.9% Pacific peoples, 14.0% Asian, and 2.4% other ethnicities (totals add to more than 100% since people could identify with multiple ethnicities).

The proportion of people born overseas was 21.9%, compared with 27.1% nationally.

Although some people objected to giving their religion, 52.7% had no religion, 32.8% were Christian, 2.9% were Hindu, 0.5% were Muslim, 1.9% were Buddhist and 2.4% had other religions.

Of those at least 15 years old, 261 (24.9%) people had a bachelor or higher degree, and 198 (18.9%) people had no formal qualifications. The median income was $32,700, compared with $31,800 nationally. 153 people (14.6%) earned over $70,000 compared to 17.2% nationally. The employment status of those at least 15 was that 579 (55.3%) people were employed full-time, 159 (15.2%) were part-time, and 51 (4.9%) were unemployed.

Education

References

Suburbs of Invercargill